Olyra is a genus of tropical bamboos in the grass family. It is native primarily to the Western Hemisphere, with one species extending into Africa.

Species

Olyra amapana Soderstr. & Zuloaga - Brazil(Amapá, Rondônia, Amazonas), Venezuela (Amazonas))
Olyra bahiensis R.P.Oliveira & Longhi-Wagner - Bahia
Olyra buchtienii Hack. - Peru, Bolivia
Olyra caudata Trin. - Trinidad & Tobago, Costa Rica, Panama, Colombia, Venezuela, Guyana, Suriname, French Guiana, Brazil, Bolivia, Peru, Ecuador
Olyra ciliatifolia Raddi - Trinidad & Tobago, Colombia, Venezuela, Guyana, Suriname, French Guiana, Brazil, Bolivia, Paraguay, Argentina (Misiones, Corrientes)
Olyra davidseana Judz. & Zuloaga - Brazil (Pará, Amazonas)
Olyra ecaudata Döll - Nicaragua, Costa Rica, Panama, Colombia, Venezuela, Guyana, Suriname, French Guiana, Brazil, Bolivia, Peru, Ecuador
Olyra fasciculata Trin. - Brazil, Peru, Bolivia, Paraguay, Argentina (Tucumán, Salta, Jujuy, Misiones)
Olyra filiformis Trin. - Bahia 
Olyra glaberrima Raddi - Mexico, Central America, Peru, Brazil, Paraguay
Olyra holttumiana Soderstr. & Zuloaga - Panama
Olyra humilis Nees - Brazil, Paraguay, Argentina (Misiones, Corrientes)
Olyra juruana Mez - Brazil (Pará, Amazonas), Peru (Loreto, Cusco, Pasco)
Olyra latifolia L. - tropical Africa (Senegal to Zimbabwe), Comoros, Madagascar, Americas (Mexico to Paraguay + West Indies)
Olyra latispicula Soderstr. & Zuloaga - Bahia
Olyra longifolia Kunth - tropical South America
Olyra loretensis Mez - Bolivia, Colombia, Peru, Brazil 
Olyra maranonensis Swallen - Peru
Olyra obliquifolia Steud. - Suriname, French Guiana, Brazil (Amapá, Pará, Maranhão)
Olyra retrorsa Soderstr. & Zuloaga - Mato Grosso
Olyra standleyi Hitchc. - Costa Rica, Panama, Venezuela, Colombia
Olyra tamanquareana Soderstr. & Zuloaga - Brazil (Amazonas)
Olyra taquara Swallen - Brazil (Goiás, Mato Grosso, Mato Grosso do Sul, Minas Gerais, D.F., Pará)
Olyra wurdackii Swallen - Venezuela (Amazonas), Brazil (Amazonas)

formerly included

see Agnesia Arberella Cryptochloa Ichnanthus Lithachne Parodiolyra Piresia Piresiella Raddia Raddiella Sucrea

References

Bambusoideae genera
Grasses of North America
Grasses of South America
Flora of Central America
Flora of the Caribbean
Grasses of Brazil